Qualification for women's artistic gymnastics competitions at the 2020 Summer Olympics was held at the Ariake Gymnastics Centre on 25 July 2021. The results of the qualification determined the qualifiers to the finals: 8 teams in the team final, 24 gymnasts in the individual all-around final, and 8 gymnasts in each of 4 apparatus finals. The competition was divided into five subdivisions.

Subdivisions

Gymnasts from nations taking part in the team all-around event were grouped together while the remaining gymnasts were grouped into one of eight mixed groups. The groups were divided into the five subdivisions after a draw held by the Fédération Internationale de Gymnastique. The groups rotated through each of the four apparatuses together.
ind: Individual gymnast

Results

Team

Individual all-around 

 Changes before the final

Vault 

 Changes before the final

Uneven bars 

 Changes before the final

Balance beam 

 Changes before the final

Floor 

 Changes before the final

Notes

References 

Women's artistic qualification
2020
2021 in gymnastics